23S rRNA (guanine2445-N2)-methyltransferase (ycbY (gene), rlmL (gene)) is an enzyme with systematic name S-adenosyl-L-methionine:23S rRNA (guanine2445-N2)-methyltransferase. This enzyme catalyses the following chemical reaction

 S-adenosyl-L-methionine + guanine2445 in 23S rRNA  S-adenosyl-L-homocysteine + N2-methylguanine2445 in 23S rRNA

The enzyme methylates 23S rRNA in vitro.

References

External links 
 

EC 2.1.1